Ferenc Molnár (born Ferenc Neumann; January 12, 1878April 1, 1952), often anglicized as Franz Molnar, was a Hungarian-born author, stage director, dramatist, and poet, widely regarded as Hungary's most celebrated and controversial playwright. His primary aim through his writing was to entertain by transforming his personal experiences into literary works of art. He never connected to any one literary movement. However, he did utilize the precepts of naturalism, Neo-Romanticism, Expressionism, and Freudian psychoanalytic theories, but only as long as they suited his desires. "By fusing the realistic narrative and stage tradition of Hungary with Western influences into a cosmopolitan amalgam, Molnár emerged as a versatile artist whose style was uniquely his own." 

As a novelist, Molnár may be remembered best for The Paul Street Boys, the story of two rival gangs of youths in Budapest. It has been translated into fourteen languages and adapted for the stage and film. It has been considered a masterpiece by many. It was, however, as a playwright that he made his most significant contribution and how he is best known internationally. "In his graceful, whimsical, sophisticated drawing-room comedies, he provided a felicitous synthesis of naturalism and fantasy, realism and romanticism, cynicism, and sentimentality, the profane and the sublime." Out of his many plays, The Devil, Liliom, The Swan, The Guardsman, and The Play's the Thing endure as classics. His influences included luminaries such as Oscar Wilde, George Bernard Shaw, and Gerhart Hauptmann. He immigrated to the United States to escape the persecution of Hungarian Jews during World War II and later adopted American citizenship. Molná's plays continue to be relevant and performed world-wide. His national and international fame has inspired many Hungarian playwrights, including Elemér Boross, László Fodor, Lajos Bíró, Ernő Vajda, Attila Orbók, and Imre Földes, among others.

Life

Early years 
Ferenc Molnár was born in Budapest on January 12, 1878, to Dr. Mór Neumann, a prosperous and well-regarded gastroenterologist, and Jozefa Wallfisch, both of German-Jewish heritage. The home in which he lived was opulent but gloomy. Even though he was born into wealth, "It was not a friendly atmosphere for the lively and precocious Ferenc, who constantly had to be warned to keep quiet." Just a year before his birth, his parents' firstborn son and Molnár's brother, László, died. His mother was frail and frequently bedridden. Illness spread throughout the rooms of his house, and young Ferenc constantly was being told to keep quiet. 

In 1887, Molnár entered the Református Gimnázium, a secondary school (high school) located in Miskolc, Hungary, where he was inspired to learn foreign languages and where his talent as a writer began to take shape. At fourteen, he started a periodical, Haladás (Progress), which sold only four copies, and a secondary publication, É letképek (Panorama), selling only 20 copies.  His first dramatic work was A Kék Barlang (Blue Cave), a controversial play written, directed, and staged in the basement of a friend's house. 

Upon completing secondary school, Molnár studied law at the University of Budapest in 1895. Shortly after, he was sent to Geneva by his father to continue his studies at the Swiss University. While living in Geneva, he began to write frequently, often sending his work to various papers. Molnár also wrote the short novella Magdolna during this time. He also traveled to Paris to see some of the chic new plays. "The fashionable boulevard comedies of Bernstein, Bataille, Capus, and others left a deep impression on him and later greatly influenced his dramatic style." 

In 1896, he abandoned a legal career to pursue a full-time career as a journalist. He covered a variety of topics during his time as a journalist. However, his primary focus was the court trials for Vészi's Budapesti Napló (Budapest Daily), a newspaper then edited and published by József Vészi, a Jewish intellectual who dominated Hungarian political journalism. Molnár's first wife was one of Vészi's daughters (Margit Vészi). His mother died in 1898 when Ferenc was 20 years of age. Molnár served as a proud and jingoistic supporter of the Austro-Hungarian Empire while working as a war correspondent during  World War I. So positive were his war reports that he was decorated by the Habsburg emperor but criticized by some pacifist peers. He would later write Reflections of a War Correspondent, describing his experiences.

Literary and theatrical career 
In 1901, Molnár published his first full-length novel Az éhes város (The Hungry City). This novel made Molnár's name familiar throughout Hungary. It was "a relentless exposé of the evil effect of money, viewed by a young, idealistic newspaperman." The year following the release of Az éhes város, Molnár began writing for the theatre. It was in this medium that he became known internationally. His journalistic work influenced his early works as a playwright. Molnár's first play, A doktor úr (The Lawyer), and the play that followed, Józsi, are both comedies that were essentially a dramatization of newspaper sketches about a spoiled rich child and published as a collection of short dialogues. His personal life inspired a lot of his writing. After separating from his first wife (Margit Vészi), he became involved with the famous Hungarian actress Irén Szécsi, who was then married to a wealthy manufacturer. The affair influenced some of his more critically successful works.

In 1907, Molnár wrote Az ördög (The Devil) for Irén, in which he challenged her to leave her husband. It brought Molnár international fame and performed all over Europe and New York. Hungarian-born American director Michael Curtiz later adapted The Devil into a film; three years later, James Young directed an English-language version. Also in 1907, Molnár wrote three books, including his juvenile novel, A Pál-utcai Fiúk (The Paul Street Boys). "His fame reached its zenith with the successful performances of  Liliom  abroad, though the play initially had been a failure in Budapest."  Molnár sought to regain favor with his wife, Lili, by portraying her in the role of Juli. It became his best-known play, adapted into a film by Fritz Lang featuring Charles Boyer (Paris, 1934) and the Broadway stage musical, Carousel (1945; film 1956) by Richard Rodgers and Oscar Hammerstein II. Molnár expressed the complexities of his affair with Irén through his plays, The Guardsman (1910) and The Wolf (1912); The Guardsman served as the basis for the 1931 film of the same name, starring American power couple Alfred Lunt and Lynn Fontanne.

Molnár fell into a deep depression after Irén cut off the affair and returned to her family. He resorted to drinking heavily as a result, and in 1911 attempted suicide. He was rehabilitated in Austria and continued writing during this dark time. Between 1910 and 1914, five volumes of his collected essays, plus his translations of over 30 French plays, were published. "Molnár's long and turbulent life was one of hard and incessant work. For over 50 years, he transposed his inner conflict in his literary work; writing was his oxygen, elixir, and self-therapy," wrote monographist and fellow Hungarian emigré Clara (Klára) Györgyey.

Later years and death 
On January 12, 1940, Molnár relocated to America and spent his last 12 years living in Room 835 at New York's Plaza Hotel. In 1943, he suffered a massive heart attack, forcing him to suspend work for almost a year. To celebrate the end of World War II, Molnár wrote and published Isten veled szivem (God Be With You My Heart) and the English Edition of The Captain of St Margaret's. 

After the war, Molnár became outraged and depressed after learning of the fate of his Jewish friends and colleagues during the Holocaust in Hungary, and his personality changed. He became apathetic, morose, and misanthropic. 

In 1947, Molnár's secretary and devoted companion Wanda Bartha committed suicide. This event had a lasting effect on Molnár. Upon her death, he wrote Companion in Exile, his most tragic work, recalling his friend's sacrifices and their time together. Molnár donated all his manuscripts and bound scrapbooks containing articles about him, prepared by Wanda Bartha, to the New York Public Library. 

Molnár died of cancer, aged 74, at the Mount Sinai Hospital in New York City on April 1, 1952. Because of his superstitious fear that creating a will would hasten his death, Molnár left behind several manuscripts, unfinished work, and a significant amount of money. Only his wife, Lili Darvas, attended his funeral with a few close friends. In the name of all women Molnár had loved, Lili Darvas bid him farewell with a quotation: "Liliom, sleep my boy, sleep!"

Bibliography

Plays

 The Lawyer (1902)
 Jozsi (1904)
 The Devil (1907)
 Liliom (1909)
 The Guardsman (1910)
 The Tale of the Wolf (1912)
 The White Cloud (1916)
 Carnival (1916)
 Fashions for Men (1917)
 The Swan (1920)
 The Play's the Thing (1926)
 Olympia (1928)
 One two three (1929)
 The Good Fairy (1930)
 Delicate Story (1940)
 The King's Maid (1941)

Books

 The Hungry City (1901)
 The Paul Street Boys (1906)
 The Memoirs of a War Correspondent (1916)
 The Captain of St. Margaret's (1926)
 Farewell My Heart (1945)
 Companion in Exile: Notes for an Autobiography (1950)

Other

References

External links

 
 
 
 
 Ferenc Molnár papers (1927–1952), held by the Billy Rose Theatre Division, New York Public Library for the Performing Arts
 Portraits, held at the Billy Rose Theatre Division, New York Public Library for the Performing Arts
 
 

1878 births
1952 deaths
20th-century Hungarian dramatists and playwrights
20th-century Hungarian male writers
20th-century Hungarian novelists
American people of Hungarian-Jewish descent
Austro-Hungarian Jews
Esquire (magazine) people
Hungarian Jews
Hungarian children's writers
Hungarian emigrants to the United States
Hungarian male dramatists and playwrights
Hungarian male novelists
Jewish American writers
Jewish dramatists and playwrights
Theatre people from Budapest
Writers from Budapest